Certified is a collaboration album by rappers Lil' Flip and Gudda Gudda of Young Money Entertainment.

Track listing

References

2009 albums
Albums produced by Cozmo
Real Talk Entertainment albums
Lil' Flip albums
Albums produced by Big Hollis
Collaborative albums
Gudda Gudda albums